is a Prefectural Natural Park in Kanagawa Prefecture, Japan. Established in 1960, it derives its name from the Tanzawa Mountains. The park spans the borders of the municipalities of Aikawa, Atsugi, Hadano, Isehara, Kiyokawa, Sagamihara, and Yamakita.

See also
 National Parks of Japan
 Tanzawa-Ōyama Quasi-National Park

References

External links
  Tanzawa-Ōyama Prefectural Natural Park

Parks and gardens in Kanagawa Prefecture
Protected areas established in 1960
1960 establishments in Japan
Aikawa, Kanagawa
Atsugi, Kanagawa
Hadano, Kanagawa
Isehara, Kanagawa
Kiyokawa, Kanagawa
Sagamihara
Yamakita, Kanagawa